Hedvig Mollestad Thomassen (born 4 February 1982) is a Norwegian guitarist, vocalist and composer. She is known for a series of album releases and collaborations with musicians like Jon Eberson, Jarle Bernhoft and Hilde Marie Kjersem.

Career 
Thomassen was born in Ålesund. She is a graduate from the Norwegian Academy of Music, and performs with a variety of rock and jazz bands, including her own Hedvig Mollestad Trio, Bronco Busters, Songs and Sweet Potatoes, and VOM (as "Mester Pøggs"). She also has a central role in the bands of Jarle Bernhoft and Hilde Marie Kjersem, and has performed with Trondheim Jazz Orchestra. Thomassen was awarded "The young jazz talent of the year" at Moldejazz in 2009, and played a gig within Jarle Bernhoft Band at the 2011 Kongsberg Jazzfestival. When she released her debut solo album Shoot! (2011) leading her own trio, the music bears little resemblance to what she plays with Jon Eberson Group and the bands of Hilde Marie Kjersem and Jarle Bernhoft.

Hedvig Mollestad Trio 
Hedvig Mollestad Trio (also referred to as HM3) consists of Hedvig Mollestad (guitar, vocals), Ellen Brekken (bass) and Ivar Loe Bjørnstad (drums). The trio has received numerous appraising reviews internationally, for both their studio albums and live performances. Their music is inspired by '70s heavyrock, but creates a peculiar musical mixture of ingredients like free jazz, prog and psychedelia. On its website the band describes their own music as "Outgoing & progressive instrumental rock". Since the trio's formation in 2009, HM3 has played many concerts and jazz festivals in both Norway and abroad and they have toured in Europe, Malaysia, Japan and the USA. In reviews of two of the band's albums, All About Jazz critique John Kelman states:

Prizes and honors 
 2009: Jazztalentprisen for The young jazz talent of the year awarded at Moldejazz
 2020: EDVARD-prisen for the album Ekhidna

Discography

Hedvig Mollestad Trio 
2011: Shoot! (Rune Grammofon)
2013: All of Them Witches (Rune Grammofon)
2014: Enfant Terrible! (Rune Grammofon)
2016: Black Stabat Mater (Rune Grammofon)
2016: Evil In Oslo (Rune Grammofon)
2019: Smells Funny (Rune Grammofon)
2021: Ding Dong. You're Dead. (Rune Grammofon)

Collaborations 
With The Cumshots
2009: A Life Less Necessary (Rodeostar Records)

With Jarle Bernhoft
2010: 1:Man 2:Band (Kikitépe Cassette)

With Jon Eberson Group
2011: The Coarse Sand & The Names We Wrote (JEG Records)

With Trondheim Jazz Orchestra
2011: Migrations (MNJ Records), feat. Øyvind Brække
2022: Maternity Beat (Rune Grammofon)

With Hilde Marie Kjersem
2011: Let's Let Go (Brødr. Recordings)

With "El Doom & The Born Electric"
2012: El Doom & The Born Electric (Rune Grammofon)

References

External links 

 Hedvig Mollestad Trio (HM3) official homepage
Hedvig Mollestad Trio – Gun And The E-Kid – Steinkjerfestivalen 2012 on YouTube
Hedvig Mollestad Trio – European Tour 2013 on YouTube

1982 births
Living people
Musicians from Ålesund
Norwegian Academy of Music alumni
Norwegian jazz guitarists
Norwegian jazz composers
Rune Grammofon artists
21st-century Norwegian guitarists
Trondheim Jazz Orchestra members